Duke of la Torre is a hereditary title in the Peerage of Spain, accompanied by the dignity of Grandee and granted in 1862 by Isabella II to Francisco Serrano, Count consort of San Antonio, in acknowledgement of his loyalty during his time as Captain General of Cuba.

Dukes of la Torre

Francisco Serrano y Domínguez, 1st Duke of la Torre
Francisco María Buenaventura Serrano y Domínguez, 2nd Duke of la Torre
Carlos Ignacio Martínez de Campos y Serrano, 3rd Duke of la Torre
Leopoldo Martínez de Campos y Muñoz, 4th Duke of la Torre
Carlos Martínez de Campos y Carulla, 5th Duke of la Torre

See also
List of dukes in the peerage of Spain
List of current Grandees of Spain

References

Bibliography

Further reading
Geneall.net List of Dukes of la Torre
Elenco de Grandezas y Títulos Nobiliarios Españoles, Hidalguía Editions, 2008

 
Dukedoms of Spain
Grandees of Spain
Lists of dukes
Lists of Spanish nobility